Mole map may refer to:

 Mole map (chemistry), a graphical representation of an algorithm
 Mole map (dermatology), a medical record which records and image and the location of lesions and/or moles